Derek Edward Dawson Beales, FBA (born 12 June 1931, Felixstowe) is a British historian. He has written the definitive work on the Holy Roman Emperor Joseph II.

He was educated at the University of Cambridge, where he gained a BA in 1953, an MA and a PhD in 1957. He was appointed a Fellow of Sidney Sussex College, Cambridge in 1955 and a University Lecturer in History in 1965, which he held until 1980. He was then Professor of Modern History at Cambridge until 1997.

He was editor of The Historical Journal from 1971 until 1975. From 1984 until 1987 he was a member of the council of the Royal Historical Society. In 1989 he was elected a fellow of the British Academy.

Works
England and Italy, 1859-60 (London: Nelson,1961).
From Castlereagh to Gladstone, 1815-1885 (London: Thomas Nelson and Sons Ltd, 1969).
Joseph II, Volume I: In the Shadow of Maria Theresa, 1741-1780 (Cambridge: Cambridge University Press, 1987).
Prosperity and Plunder: European Catholic Monasteries in the Age of Revolution, 1650–1815 (Cambridge: Cambridge University Press, 2003).
Enlightenment and Reform in 18th-Century Europe (I.B. Tauris, 2005).
Joseph II, Volume II: Against the World, 1780–1790 (Cambridge: Cambridge University Press, 2009).

Notes

Further reading
T. C. W. Blanning and David Cannadine, History and Biography: Essays in Honour of Derek Beales (Cambridge: Cambridge University Press, 1996).

1931 births
Living people
Alumni of the University of Cambridge
Fellows of Sidney Sussex College, Cambridge
Academics of the University of Cambridge
British historians
People from Felixstowe
Fellows of the British Academy